Fernando Fabricio Platas Álvarez (born March 16, 1973, in Mexico City) is a Mexican diver. He began diving since he was a young boy. In 1990 he won in Germany two tests of 2 and 10 metres, and in that same year he won three gold medals in the Central American Games which took place in Mexico City.

In 1992, he represented Mexico in the 1992 Summer Olympics in Barcelona, Spain and in 1993 he won a silver medal in the FINA Championships.

Winner of the silver medal in the FINA Championships, for 1999 he won the gold medal in the 3 metre springboard.

During the 2000 Summer Olympics in Sydney, Australia he won the silver medal in the 3 metre springboard.

In his résumé, he is also distinguished by winning the Sport National Award in 1995, and he has been twice the standard-bearer of the Mexican Olympic Delegation in the 2000 Summer Olympics and in the 2004 Summer Olympics, in Athens, Greece.

He ran the National Action Party federal deputy for the Federal Electoral District XXIV Mexico State in the elections of 2009.

References

External links
 

1973 births
Living people
Mexican male divers
Divers from Mexico City
Divers at the 1992 Summer Olympics
Divers at the 1996 Summer Olympics
Divers at the 2000 Summer Olympics
Divers at the 2004 Summer Olympics
Olympic silver medalists for Mexico
Olympic divers of Mexico
Olympic medalists in diving
Medalists at the 2000 Summer Olympics
World Aquatics Championships medalists in diving
Pan American Games gold medalists for Mexico
Pan American Games silver medalists for Mexico
Pan American Games medalists in diving
Universiade medalists in diving
Divers at the 2003 Pan American Games
Divers at the 1999 Pan American Games
Divers at the 1995 Pan American Games
Universiade gold medalists for Mexico
Medalists at the 1995 Summer Universiade
Medalists at the 1999 Summer Universiade
Medalists at the 2001 Summer Universiade
Medalists at the 1995 Pan American Games
Medalists at the 1999 Pan American Games
20th-century Mexican people
21st-century Mexican people